Scratch-As-Catch-Can is a 1932 American short comedy film directed by Mark Sandrich. It was nominated for an Academy Award at the 5th Academy Awards for Best Short Subject (Comedy).

This was a replacement for the originally nominated short Stout Hearts and Willing Hands, which was disqualified, for unknown reasons.

Cast
 Bobby Clark
 Paul McCullough
 James Finlayson
 Walter Brennan
 Robert Graves (as Robert Graves Jr.)
 Charlie Hall
 Vince Barnett

References

External links

1932 films
1932 comedy films
1932 short films
American black-and-white films
RKO Pictures short films
Films directed by Mark Sandrich
American comedy short films
1930s English-language films
1930s American films